Atharabari Mahim Chandra High School is a school in Ishwarganj Upazila, Mymensingh District, Bangladesh, located near Atharabari jamider bari. It was founded in 1910 by Jamider Mohim Chandra Roy. There are approximately 1,500 students currently enrolled.

History
Atharabari M.C. High School was established in 1910. It is a half-government high school. During the last 100 years, it has educated many outstanding students who have been recognized for national importance.
There are a degree college, a primary school, a hospital, and a post office beside the school. The school plays a vital role for making educative people in the atharabari region.The improvement of the school is increasing day by day.

Admission
Generally, admission is permitted in class six once a year. There is no eligibility criteria to sit the admission test. Students who perform well on the test are usually admitted.

Tuition fees
As a half-government high school, the tuition fees are very low compared to private school tuition fees.

School uniform
 Long- or short-sleeved green shirt and white trousers (boys)
 White sallower and green skirt (girls)

Educational facilities
The school has many educational facilities, including a science laboratory, a workshop, a computer lab, and a library. Physics, chemistry, and biology lessons are normally conducted in the science laboratory.

References

High schools in Bangladesh
Schools in Mymensingh District
1910 establishments in India
Educational institutions established in 1910